Bash-Bulak is a village in Kara-Suu District of Osh Region of Kyrgyzstan. It is the center of Katta-Taldyk rural community. Its population was 6,020 in 2021.

Population

References

External links 
 Satellite map at Maplandia.com

Populated places in Osh Region